Bracebridge is a town and the seat of the Muskoka District Municipality in Ontario, Canada.

The town was built around a waterfall on the Muskoka River in the centre of town, and is known for its other nearby waterfalls (Wilson's Falls, High Falls, etc.). It was first incorporated in 1875.

The town is the seat of the district government, a centre of tourism for the Muskoka area, and home to several historical sites, such as the Clock Tower, Woodchester Villa, and the Silver Bridge, which joins Manitoba Street with Ecclestone Drive. The Silver Bridge was repaired in 2002.

History

Early growth of the town occurred in proximity to the falls which powered the first factory. The arrival of the Grand Trunk Railway cemented the town's role as a transportation hub for the area.

Modern settlement of the town began in the 1860s, beginning at first with a few log huts. The Muskoka colonization road had been completed to the first falls on the north branch of the Muskoka River by 1862. Entrepreneurs began to take advantage of the area's water power. With the advent of steamship service on Lake Muskoka a few years later, Bracebridge prospered as the main distribution centre for the region.

By 1869, Bracebridge was a village with a population of 160 in the Township of Macaulay, Victoria County. (In 1868 Macauley and six additional townships had been detached from the County and transferred to the new District of Muskoka, but were not withdrawn for municipal purposes until 1877.) The village was established on the Muskoka River. There were stages in winter and boats in summer from Barrie to Washago. The average price of wild land was $2 to $5 an acre while improved land was $10 per acre.
 
By 1870 the village had a population of about 400, growing to reach a total of about 2,000 by the turn of the 20th century. The village was incorporated in 1875 and became a town under an Act of Parliament in 1889. In 1894 Bracebridge became the first town in Ontario to have its own hydro generating station. In 1971 Macaulay Township was merged into Bracebridge.

The municipal boundaries of Bracebridge also encompass the smaller communities of Clear Lake, Falkenburg (ghost town), Falkenburg Station, Fraserburg, Germania, Lakewood, Matthiasville, Monsell (ghost town), Purbrook, Rocksborough, Springdale Park, Stoneleigh, Uffington and Vankoughnet.

Transportation

Bracebridge is immediately adjacent to Highway 11, a major provincial highway that connects the community to Greater Toronto in under 2 hours, as well as to markets in Northern Ontario. Muskoka Airport, which serves general aviation and scheduled flights from Billy Bishop Toronto City Airport, is located 5 km south of Bracebridge.

While rail service to Bracebridge has been discontinued, the community is serviced by coach bus line that departs from the Bracebridge Quality Inn and takes passengers south to Toronto and north to North Bay.  In 2016 the municipality launched Bracebridge Transit, a one-hour, single-route schedule that gets residents around the urban core.  Bracebridge Mobility also offers door-to-door service to individuals who are unable to access the regular transit service due to mobility issues. The site of the Bracebridge station with wait building remains.

Climate

Education
Bracebridge is served by several elementary schools and two high schools: Bracebridge and Muskoka Lakes Secondary School, and Saint Dominic Catholic Secondary School. Public education is administered by the Trillium Lakelands District School Board, and Catholic education is administered by the Simcoe Muskoka Catholic District School Board.

Georgian College operates a satellite campus in the town with programming that supports the local labour market. Nipissing University operated in Bracebridge for over 21 years but chose to consolidate its operations in 2016 resulting in the closure of the local campus.  The facility was purchased in 2018 by Dewey College, an independent high school registered with the Ontario Ministry of Education that offers international students a range of programs from high school to ESL and AP programs.

Demographics

Sports

The Town of Bracebridge built a Sportsplex in 2006 which contains a rock climbing wall, indoor track, eight-lane swimming pool and fitness studio. The town partnered with the Muskoka Limberettes Gymnastics Club to create a gymnastics facility in the same building. The Sportsplex is part of the same complex including the Bracebridge and Muskoka Lakes Secondary School and Rene M. Caisse Memorial Theatre.

Bracebridge also opened a new 3.75 Million dollar softball venue called Peake Fields at Verena Acres. This facility supports a Men's League, Women's League, and Minor Ball, as well as slow pitch. The Men's fastball League has been running for some 35 years, and has produced 4 Ontario Intermediate Fastball Championships, and 3 Canadian Championships, with all local players.

Plans are currently in place for a new Arena/Fieldhouse/Library complex that is now currently under construction with an expected expected opening of the facility in March 2023

Attractions and venues
Bracebridge is the home of Santa's Village, a Christmas theme park, established in 1955. It was inspired by the town's location at 45 degrees latitude, halfway between the equator and the North Pole. In 2016, Bracebridge held its first annual Fire and Ice Festival.

Media
Bracebridge is served by the local radio stations CFBG-FM and CJMU-FM. Local newspapers include Bracebridge Examiner, District Weekender, Muskoka Sun and Muskoka Advance.

The first newspaper in Bracebridge was the Northern Advocate begun in 1870 by Thomas McMurray. It was joined in 1872 by the Free Grant Gazette owned by E.F. Stephenson. The Advocate ceased publication in 1874 and was bought out by Stephenson. Competition resumed, however, in 1878 when Mr Gaffe and Mr Oaten founded the Muskoka Herald.

Notable residents
 Irvin "Ace" Bailey, Hockey Hall of Famer
 Patrick Boyer (born 1945), politician - born in Bracebridge
 Frank Carson, former NHL player
 William Joseph James "Doc" Carson, former NHL player, 1929 Stanley Cup
 Roger Crozier, former NHL player
 Gary Denniss, writer, teacher, historian, columnist, preacher
 Marty Gervais, writer, journalist, historian
 Mary Harron, director of American Psycho
 Kris King, former NHL player
 Deric Ruttan, Canadian country music singer/songwriter
 Liisa Savijarvi, downhill skier who competed at the 1984 Olympics
 Zander Sherman, writer
 Graydon Smith, Politician, former Mayor of Bracebridge

See also
List of townships in Ontario

References

External links

 
1875 establishments in Ontario
Lower-tier municipalities in Ontario
Towns in Ontario